Ki was the earth goddess in Sumerian religion, chief consort of the sky god An.  In some legends Ki and An were brother and sister, being the offspring of Anshar ("Sky Pivot") and Kishar ("Earth Pivot"), earlier personifications of heaven and earth.

By her consort Anu (also known as Anunna), Ki gave birth to Anunnaki, the most prominent of these deities being Enlil, god of the air. According to legends, heaven and earth were once inseparable until Enlil was born; Enlil cleaved heaven and earth in two. An carried away heaven. Ki, in company with Enlil, took the earth. Ki marries her son, Enlil, and from this union all the plant and animal life on earth is produced.

Some authorities question whether Ki was regarded as a deity since there is no evidence of a cult and the name appears only in a limited number of Sumerian creation texts. Samuel Noah Kramer identifies Ki with the Sumerian mother goddess Ninhursag and claims that they were originally the same figure.

She later developed into the Babylonian and Akkadian goddess Antu, consort of the god Anu (from Sumerian An).

Family 

Ki was the wife and chief consort of Anu, the God of the Sky. They are thought to be brother and sister, who could both be offspring of the God named Anshar (the sky pivot) and Kishar (the earth pivot). Making Anshar and Kishar her father and mother.  

Ki was a mother to 1, who was named Enlil. Her son Enlil the God of Air, was part of the Anunnaki. Ki ends up marrying her son, Enlil, and according to the myth this was how the plants and animals were created on Earth.

Cuneiform sign
Cuneiform Ki (Borger 2003 nr. 737; U+121A0 ) is the sign for "earth". It is also read as GI5, GUNNI (=KI.NE) "hearth", KARAŠ (=KI.KAL.BAD) "encampment, army", KISLAḪ (=KI.UD) "threshing floor", and SUR7 (=KI.GAG). 
In Akkadian orthography, it functions as a determiner for toponyms and has the syllabic values gi, ge, qi, and qe.

References 

 Michael Jordan, Encyclopedia of Gods, Kyle Cathie Limited, 2002
 Creation and Chaos : A Reconsideration of Hermann Gunkel's Chaoskampf Hypothesis, edited by JoAnn Scurlock, and Richard H. Beal, Penn State University Press, 2013. ProQuest Ebook Central.
 Holland, Glenn S. Gods in the Desert : Religions of the Ancient Near East, Rowman & Littlefield Publishers, 2009. ProQuest Ebook Central.
 Leick, Gwendolyn, and Dr, Gwendo Leick. A Dictionary of Ancient near Eastern Mythology, Taylor & Francis Group, 1991. ProQuest Ebook Central.
https://www.geni.com/people/Ki-Goddess-of-the-Earth/6000000003645882297 

Mesopotamian goddesses
Earth goddesses
Underworld goddesses